Pay grades are used by the eight uniformed services of the United States (Army, Marine Corps, Navy, Air Force, Space Force, Coast Guard, Public Health Service Commissioned Corps, and NOAA Commissioned Officer Corps) to determine wages and benefits based on the corresponding military rank of a member of the services. While different ranks may be used among the eight uniformed services, pay grades are uniform and equivalent between the services and can be used to quickly determine seniority among a group of members from different services. They are also essential when determining a member's entitlements such as basic pay and allowances.

Structure
Pay grades are divided into three groups: enlisted (E), warrant officer (W), and officer (O). Enlisted pay grades begin at E-1 and end at E-9; warrant officer pay grades originate at W-1 and terminate at W-5; and officer pay grades start at O-1 and finish at O-10. Not all of the uniformed services use all of the grades; for example, the Coast Guard has authority to use, but does not use the grades of W-1 and W-5, the United States Navy formerly did not use the grade of W-1 and the United States Air Force discontinued appointing new warrant officers in 1959 (although the last USAF warrant officer did not retire until 1992).

Although authorized to do so, neither the National Oceanic and Atmospheric Administration Commissioned Officer Corps (NOAA Corps) nor the United States Public Health Service Commissioned Corps use any of the enlisted or warrant officer grades. Additionally, while not formally established as one of the eight uniformed services, the Maritime Service (which provides officers serving in the Maritime Administration and as administrators and instructors at the U.S. Merchant Marine Academy (USMMA), and the six state-operated maritime academies) is also authorized, but does not currently employ, enlisted or warrant officer grades.

Officers in pay grades O-1, O-2, and O-3 with more than four years of prior cumulative service (creditable toward both length of service and retirement) in an enlisted or warrant officer grade are paid "... the special rate of basic pay for pay grade O-1E, O-2E, or O-3E," respectively. This benefit does not affect their rank and is used simply for reward and incentive purposes in recognition of their prior enlisted (or warrant officer) experience. A cumulative total of 1,440 days of creditable Federal active duty and/or reserve inactive duty for training days is required to qualify.

The pay grade of W-1 is normally reserved for officers appointed using a "warrant" rather than a "commission" by the Secretary of Defense or by each of the service secretaries, using authority delegated from the President, to an intermediate rank between enlisted non-commissioned officers and commissioned officers (starting at W-2). However, appointments to this grade can by made by commission by the service secretaries, defense secretary, or the President, but this is more uncommon. By law, regulation, and traditional customs and courtesies across the military services, warrant officers serving in pay grade W-1 have the same privileges as commissioned officers (with certain exceptions grounded in the distinction required in the Constitution that all "officers of the United States" be commissioned, which affects the command authority and specific standing of W-1's under the Uniform Code of Military Justice (UCMJ) and the Manual for Courts-Martial).

While cadets and midshipmen directly appointed by the President to four of the Federal Service Academies (U.S. Military Academy; U.S. Naval Academy; U.S. Air Force Academy; U.S. Coast Guard Academy) are members of the Regular Component of their Service, serving on active duty, they hold neither a commission nor a warrant of appointment, nor do they hold an enlisted grade or rank. U.S. statutes no longer include any pay grade for cadets or midshipmen; as "inchoate officers" appointed using the Appointments Clause of the U.S. Constitution as "inferior officers," they are recognized as having only a precedence below the most junior warrant officer, and above the enlisted grades, and almost entirely lack any authority over any other servicemembers (including other cadets and midshipmen) except for specific internal Academy functions, or very narrowly drawn training purposes while serving with their Service for leadership and skills development.

Those appointed to attend the U.S. Merchant Marine Academy (the fifth Federal Service Academy), by the Administrator of the Maritime Administration (within the Department of Transportation), will also be appointed by the Secretary of the Navy directly as Midshipmen, U.S. Navy Reserve, without enlistment. Additionally, the Service Secretaries will appoint the cadets or midshipmen of the Senior Reserve Officers Training Corps (ROTC), but unlike the cadets and midshipmen of each Federal Service Academy, ROTC cadets and midshipmen are first enlisted into the reserve component of their respective service. Cadets and midshipmen from both the USMMA and ROTC are appointed as "inchoate officers" without a commission or warrant, but unlike the other four Federal service academies, they are also appointed under Article II as "inferior officers" in their respective reserve component, and only serve on active duty during authorized training events (typically the "Sea Year" for USMMA midshipmen, or for ROTC during the summers between years of college). They share the ill-defined precedence, and lack of statutory pay grade, of cadets and midshipmen of the Academies, and have even less apparent authority (since they are generally not in any official duty status) beyond their internal USMMA and ROTC requirements, although they—like the cadets and midshipmen serving in the Regular Component at the Federal Service Academies—have the innate potential to command troops in emergencies, and otherwise perform duties far beyond their academic environment, as required by competent authorities.

The basic pay rate for both Academy and non-active duty ROTC cadets and midshipmen is $1,272.20, effective 1 January 2023, which is "the monthly rate equal to 35 percent of the basic pay of a commissioned officer in the pay grade O–1 with less than two years of service."

NATO equivalents 
The enlisted grades correspond with the NATO rank codes, with E-1 being equivalent to OR-1, E-2 equivalent to OR-2, and so on. The officer grades are all one higher than their NATO equivalent (except O-1) as the O-1 and O-2 grades are both equivalent to the NATO code of OF-1. Hence O-3 is equivalent to OF-2, O-4 is equivalent to OF-3, and so on. U.S. warrant officer grades (W-1 through W-5) are depicted in the NATO system as WO-1 through WO-5. The United States is the only nation that has officers in this category.

Enlisted

Note: The Public Health Service Commissioned Corps and NOAA Commissioned Officer Corps consist entirely of commissioned officers and do not use any of the enlisted (or warrant officer) pay grades.

Warrant officer

Officer

See also 
 List of comparative military ranks
 Ranks and insignia of NATO
 General Schedule (US civil service pay scale)
 Military compensation

Notes

References

External links 
 Current and historic pay charts 

United States Department of Defense
United States military pay and benefits